Lesley Nicol may refer to:

Lesley Rumball (born 1973), former New Zealand netball player; born Lesley Marie Nicol
Lesley Nicol (actress), English actress